Bhargavi (1983–2008) was born in Gorantla (Guntur district). Her first film was YVS Chowdary's Devadasu, through which she first achieved recognition. She also appeared in Ashta Chamma, based on Oscar Wilde's play The Importance of Being Earnest, as Varalakshmi (the equivalent of Cecily Cardew in Earnest). Before acting in Ashta Chamma, she worked in several TV serials. She rose to fame with the TV show Ammamma.com, produced under the banner Just Yellow. On 16 December 2008, Bhargavi was found murdered in her Banjara Hills house along with an orchestra troupe operator, Praveen Kumar, triggering speculation about the motive behind the deaths.

Filmography

Films

Television

Death
Praveen (Buji) runs a musical orchestra (Saibaba orchestra) for the past five years. He was quite popular in the Nellore area and was married twice before, to Dolly (daughter of Guntur ex DSP) and Swapna (second heroine in NTR's film Subbu) in the past. He also has a son. There were rumors that Bujji had married Bhargavi (on 12 February 2006) in the presence of his friends at Murali Krishna hotel (in Nellore).

The suicide notes say that Bhargavi and Bujji got married in 2006 and were separated in the past few months. Bhargavi also wrote in the letter that she distanced herself from him after rising to fame with the release of Ashta Chamma. He also claimed that Bhargavi's mother had created a rift between them after Bhargavi got film offers.

Bhargavi's father confirmed that his daughter never married Bujji. He also said that she did not show any signs of strain in her visit. Bhargavi's parents reiterated that she was a strong girl and would never attempt suicide.

Police department confirmed that Bujji might have killed Bhargavi by using a knife (as eight knife marks were found on her). Bujji might have consumed poison after killing Bhargavi as there was foam in Bujji's mouth.

References

External links
 

1983 births
2008 deaths
21st-century Indian actresses
Telugu actresses
People from Guntur district
Actresses from Andhra Pradesh
Actresses in Telugu cinema
Indian film actresses
Indian television actresses
Actresses in Telugu television
People murdered in Andhra Pradesh